Pritzlaff is a surname. Although mainly found in German-speaking countries, it is derived from a Slavic personal name. Notable people with the surname include:

Donny Pritzlaff (born 1979), American freestyle wrestler 
John Pritzlaff:
John C. Pritzlaff (1820-1900), Prussian-American businessman 
John C. Pritzlaff Jr. (1925–2005), American politician

References

See also
 

Surnames of Slavic origin